Miguel Samuel Morris Yrisarry, also known as Junior Morris or Morris III (20 October 1880 - 16 July 1951), was an Anglo-Filipino of British descent who played football as a defender for Spanish club FC Barcelona. His stepbrothers, Samuel and Enrique, also played for FC Barcelona, but Miguel was the most outstanding of the Morris brothers, the boy who appeared in the oldest photo of a Spanish football team played more than 50 games for FC Barcelona between 1901 and 1909, and also played for Hispania AC and Català FC.

Biography
Born in the Philippines as the son of an English father (James Morris) and a Basque mother. In 1886 the family moved to Barcelona, where his father had been transferred to run the Barcelona Tramways Company Limited. On the grounds near the Hippodrome of Can Tunis, their father taught his three sons Samuel, Enrique (Henry) and Júnior (Miguel) the practice of football, a sport which was then practically unknown in Barcelona. Together with his brothers, he was one of the first pioneers in the amateur beginnings of football in Catalonia, and the three of them appeared in what is regarded to be the oldest photograph of a football team in Spain, which was the two sides of the then existing Barcelona Football Club, taken on 12 March 1893, with Miguel being only a 13-year-old at the time. Out of the 24 figures in that infamous photograph, he and the referee, Alfredo Collet, were the only ones who did not play in the 11v11 game that took place that day. 

In 1899, Miguel moved to London with his father while his two older brothers stayed in Barcelona and began playing for Hispania AC. He returned to Barcelona in 1901, and joined Hispania AC where his brothers were already playing. In 1902, the three Morris brothers reinforced FC Barcelona during its participation in the Copa de la Coronacion, the first national championship disputed in Spain and the forerunner for the Copa del Rey. Miguel played alongside his two brothers in the semi-finals against Real Madrid CF (then known as Madrid FC), which was the very first El Clásico, and the final, where Barça was beaten 2–1 by Club Vizcaya (a combination of players from Athletic Club and Bilbao Football Club).

After this parenthesis with Barça, the Morris brothers continued to play at Hispania AC until 1903, when the club was dissolved for lack of players, so they then join FC Barcelona on a permanent basis, playing for the club for two years until 1905, and helping them win the Catalan championship in 1904–05. Between 1905 and 1908 he lived in Madrid where he played with Moncloa FC and Sociedad Gimnástica. On his return to Barcelona, he played again with Barça and won the Catalan championship again in 1909. Despite this, he left again, this time to join his brothers at Star FC, whose captain was Samuel. He then joined Català FC in 1912, playing with them for two seasons before retiring.

Honours
FC Barcelona
 Copa de la Coronación: 
 Runner-up: 1902

 Catalan championship
 Champions (2): 1904–05 and 1908–09

References

1880 births
1951 deaths
Filipino footballers
Spanish footballers
Association football defenders
FC Barcelona players
Migrants from the Spanish East Indies to Spain